There are currently over 60,000 people of Indian origin in Tanzania. Many of them are traders and they control a sizeable portion of the Tanzanian economy. Indians have a long history in Tanzania starting with the arrival of Gujarati traders. They came to gradually control the trade in Zanzibar. Many of the buildings constructed then still remain in Stone Town, the focal trading point on the island.

History 
Indian merchant and artisan community settlements is attested in both archaeological and literary sources. In 13th-14th century, Indian artisans were manufacturing glass beads using tube drawing technology at Zanzibar. Trade between Malindi and Bengal is also attested during early medieval periods. Vasco da Gama when he landed in east african coast found indians residing in Kilwa, Mombasa and Mozambique.

Migration from Tanzania
As a result of anti-Indian sentiment in post-independence Tanzania (beginning with the presidency of Julius Nyerere), many Indians migrated overseas to India, Pakistan, the United Kingdom, the United States, and Canada, among other nations.

Notable people
Freddie Mercury, rock musician (of Parsi descent)
Amir H. Jamal, former Minister of Finance
Al Noor Kassum, former Energy Minister
Andy Chande, businessman and philanthropist
Mustafa Jaffer Sabodo, economist and philanthropist
Shamim Khan, former Member of Parliament
Ian Iqbal Rashid, filmmaker
Sangita Myska, BBC journalist, documentary maker, TV & Radio presenter
Mohammed Dewji, CEO of MeTL, Member of Parliament (2005–2015)
Ismail Jussa, opposition politician
Mohamed Raza, Member of the Zanzibar House of Representatives
Issa G. Shivji, author and academic
Abdul Sheriff, historian
Richa Adhia, Miss Tanzania 2007
Mustafa Hassanali, fashion designer
Ally Rehmtullah, fashion designer
Ammaar Ghadiyali, 2012 Olympic swimmer
Deepak Obhrai PC MP, longest continuously-serving Conservative Member of Canadian Parliament
Rakesh Rajani, civil society and global development leader
Raheem Kassam, conservative British political activist. His parents were Tanzanian immigrants of Indian origin.
Rishi Sunak, Prime Minister of the United Kingdom

Gallery

See also

Indian diaspora in Southeast Africa
Chinese people in Tanzania
 Shirazi people
India–Tanzania relations

References

 Indian Diaspora in Africa
 Indians of East Africa

Indian diaspora in Tanzania
Ethnic groups in Tanzania